Ariel Jacob Helwani (born July 8, 1982) is a Canadian-American sports journalist, known for his coverage of mixed martial arts (MMA). He is best known for his work at MMA Fighting, but has also worked for Fox and ESPN. He has won MMA Journalist of the Year at the World MMA Awards every year since 2010.

Early life and education
Ariel Helwani (given name Hebrew for "Lion of God"; surname Arabic for "Sweet") was born to Mizrahi Jewish parents in Montreal, Quebec, Canada, as the youngest of four siblings. His father is of Syrian lineage but was born and raised in Alexandria, Egypt, and his mother is from Beirut, Lebanon. His father moved to Lebanon in his late teens, before he and his family moved to Montreal in 1967, while his mother and her family moved to the same Canadian city in 1973 because "it was starting to get increasingly dangerous for Jews in Lebanon". Helwani is the maternal nephew of David Saad, a judoka who competed in the men's lightweight event at the 1976 Summer Olympics, and Gad Saad, an evolutionary psychologist. Helwani is fluent in English, French, and Hebrew, and understands Spanish and Arabic.

Helwani grew up in Mount Royal and Westmount, Quebec, and attended the Akiva School and Herzliah High School. In 2004, Helwani graduated from Syracuse University's S.I. Newhouse School of Public Communications in Syracuse, New York. While there, he hosted a sports radio show on the student-run WERW and received a summer internship with NBC covering the 2004 Summer Olympics, but had to withdraw due to an ankle injury. Although he had encountered mixed martial arts (MMA) as a preteen,  it was when he came across it again while attending university that he decided to pursue a career in it, knowing that his fellow classmates and future rivals in sports journalism would not be interested in the then-fringe sport. Helwani has stated that he wanted to be the "Howard Cosell of MMA". He credits his mother, "who [his] friends would always call for advice", for his interview skills, and his father, "who never gave an excuse or took a sick day", for his work ethic.

Career 
Having had an internship with HBO in early 2003, Helwani became a sports production assistant at the company in 2004. After a month-long stint at Spike TV, Helwani quit and founded his own website on October 19, 2007, JarryPark.com. He stated that he starting building his network by messaging every fighter he could find on Myspace. Helwani also worked for the websites MMA Rated, Versus.com (later NBCSports.com), and AOL's FanHouse. He started working at MMA Fighting, after it was bought by AOL in 2009. There, Helwani launched the weekly show The MMA Hour with Ariel Helwani in June 2009, which he produced and hosted. The dual audio and visual nature of the show was influenced by his love of The Howard Stern Show. Helwani also hosted the website's The MMA Beat show on YouTube and co-hosted the Sirius XM radio show Fight Club.

Helwani served as an "MMA Insider" for Fox Sports 1's weekly UFC Tonight show and other pre- and post-event programming from 2011. He was fired from Fox in March 2016. Helwani then revealed that his position on UFC Tonight came under the condition that his paycheck had to come from the UFC's parent company, Zuffa. Calling it the biggest regret of his life, Helwani said he accepted the arrangement by viewing the money as coming from Fox and "filtered through" Zuffa. According to Helwani, "they didn't like certain things I was talking about on my show, and for going to a Bellator media event. But they never told me not to go, or not talk about certain things. The people I was really mad at were the people at FOX, who just let the UFC dictate what they were doing and not standing up for me."

On June 4, 2016, Helwani and two of his MMA Fighting colleagues were escorted out of UFC 199 before the main event started. Their press credentials were taken and they were banned for life from all UFC events. UFC president Dana White announced that the ban would last "As long as I'm here." and reputedly later added "[Helwani] can cover all the events he wants, he just can't have a credential". Earlier in the day, Helwani had reported that Brock Lesnar would be returning at UFC 200, hours before the UFC announced it on the 199 broadcast. UFC spokesman Dave Sholler said "professional standards dictate that journalists are to contact the UFC for comment before reporting a story", but that the scoop on Lesnar's return was not the sole reason for Helwani's removal. UFC commentator Joe Rogan stated that he was told the UFC had asked Helwani to not report the news as they suspected he had a mole leaking information to him and, without knowing who it was, would fire all possible suspects if he did. Through Twitter, Helwani called Rogan's story "100% inaccurate". On an episode of The MMA Hour, Helwani detailed the incident in an emotional broadcast. He said he was brought to see Dana White, who told him he was banned for being "too negative". He later learned this decision was made by then-UFC CEO and Zuffa founder Lorenzo Fertitta. Helwani stood by his decision to report the news in a timely manner.

The UFC's actions were widely criticized by journalists, and several high profile UFC fighters sympathized with Helwani, including Jon Jones and Chris Weidman, the latter of which said, "This sport needs the GOAT of MMA reporting".

Two days later, the UFC rescinded the ban on June 6, 2016, stating:
 Helwani credited the reactions from the media and fans for forcing the UFC to lift the ban. The UFC 199 incident facilitated the June 2017 formation of the Mixed Martial Arts Journalists Association, with interim president Dann Stupp stating "Our initial efforts in 2009 never got off the ground, but we're doing this now because it's become increasingly obvious that it's long overdue". At formation, Helwani was a member of its board of directors.

In August 2017, Helwani claimed that he was removed from the Showtime broadcast team for the Floyd Mayweather Jr. vs. Conor McGregor press tour, hours before the first press conference in Los Angeles at the UFC's request. "Not working for @SHOsports anymore on the May/Mac tour," wrote Helwani on Twitter, "UFC specifically asked to have me removed. Incredibly disappointed."

With his contract with MMA Fighting set to expire in June 2018, Helwani received an offer from ESPN that February. He notified MMA Fighting, but they never offered him a new contract. Helwani joined ESPN in June 2018, shortly after the company announced their 5-year, $1.5 billion rights package with the UFC. He hosted Ariel Helwani's MMA Show on Twitter and YouTube, Ariel & the Bad Guy with Chael Sonnen on ESPN+, and the DC & Helwani podcast with Daniel Cormier. He also contributed to occasional ESPN broadcasts of the NBA. In June 2021, Helwani announced his departure from ESPN after failing to reach terms on a new contract. Andrew Marchand of the New York Post reported that Helwani made just short of $500,000 a year at ESPN, but their new offers to him included a 5% pay reduction as part of company wide cost-cutting.

Helwani subsequently announced his return to MMA Fighting and as host and producer of The MMA Hour, with a new twice weekly schedule. He also began working for BT Sport and Spotify/The Ringer, where he also covers boxing and professional wrestling, while creating non-MMA content for his own YouTube channel. He also launched a Substack account for his written thoughts. Helwani explained that he does not want to just be viewed as "the MMA guy" or "the combat guy. I want to be viewed, quite honestly if I can be so brash, as the best interviewer in sports. And if I want to do that, I need to do many different things." In September 2021, he became a brand ambassador for BetMGM. After interning on the show in 2003, Helwani returned to Real Sports with Bryant Gumbel in July 2022, this time as an on-air correspondent.

Personal life
Helwani married Jaclyn Stein, CEO and designer at Anzie Jewelry, on October 25, 2008. They have three children, two daughters and one son, and both became American citizens on March 8, 2022. Helwani was kosher from seventh grade until his mid-20s, when he found it too difficult to stick to while traveling for work, but said he still uses tefillin every day. He is a fan of the New York Knicks, Buffalo Bills, Toronto Blue Jays, Montreal Canadiens, Everton FC and Nottingham Forest.

Work relationships

Dana White
Helwani has a long-standing feud with Ultimate Fighting Championship (UFC) president Dana White. Elie Bleier of Tablet reported that while the two initially had a friendly relationship, it began to sour in the mid-2010s while Helwani worked at Fox Sports, who was the UFC's American TV broadcaster at the time. Bleier wrote that the UFC paid Fox, and "in return expected favorable coverage". When Helwani was fired by Fox in 2016, it was rumored that White had requested the dismissal after Helwani spoke publicly about UFC fighters wanting higher pay. While working at ESPN, the UFC's current American broadcast partner, from 2018 to 2021, Helwani alleged that White would try to suppress his position in the company. "Dana White tried to get me not even to make it to my first day. I mean, he raised hell to try to stop me — my first day was June 15 — tried to stop me [from getting to] the first day. Now, to the credit of a lot of the executives there, they all said no. They all had my back. They gave me shows. They gave me opportunities. But, for the next three years, it was one roadblock after the next." For example, Helwani was frequently escorted out of spaces White was set to appear in; "Per his request, I couldn't be in his vicinity or line of sight". In 2018, Helwani stated "if someone asked [Dana White] what the issue is with Ariel, he'll say that I'm a weasel or something like that, but he doesn't have a real reason, nothing happened!" and that he was open to meeting White and burying the hatchet at any time.

On December 6, 2022, UFC fighter Paddy Pimblett who had previously been a guest on Helwani's show The MMA Hour, hosted Dana White on his own podcast Chattin Pony with Paddy The Baddy. During the podcast, the two made disparaging comments about Helwani, with Pimblett, asking him to pay fighters for the 'thousands, and thousands, and thousands of pounds [you make] from them on YouTube' and a suggestion that Helwani tells interview subjects '[You're] doing it for exposure'. He also claimed that Helwani asked Pimblett to drop paid opportunities in order to do an interview with him. Dana White also alleged that ESPN had 'let [Helwani] go'.  The following day on the broadcast of The MMA Hour, Helwani spoke at length about the remarks made by both White and Pimblett, providing evidence that contradicted their claims. This included presenting a statement from ESPN that said Helwani had left their organisation of his own accord rather than being fired, and explaining that he does not make any money from YouTube due to his contract with Vox Media providing him a fixed salary. Helwani further claimed that he had 'never once in his life asked someone to come on the show for exposure'. He also played a voice note from Pimblett revealing that it was in fact Pimblett who reached out to Helwani for an interview.

Ali Abdelaziz
Helwani also has a standing feud with mixed martial arts manager Ali Abdelaziz, president of Dominance MMA Management. In June 2020, Josh Gross of The Athletic reported that Abdelaziz holds a grudge against Helwani for disseminating negative rumors about him. An allegation that Helwani denied, while confirming that he had not had access to interview Abdelaziz's fighters for over a year. Zane Simon of Bloody Elbow wrote that after "trading barbs" in interviews and on social media for the previous couple of years, things between the two came to a head in July 2020. On an episode of DC & Helwani following UFC 251, Helwani disagreed with the suggestion that Gilbert Burns should be next to receive a title match against then-champion Kamaru Usman, favoring instead a match between Burns and Leon Edwards to determine a number one contender. Abdelaziz, manager of both Usman and Burns, then Tweeted at ESPN stating that he was "banning" the company from talking to Dominance fighters for having "a reporter who's targeting my champions. You need an immediate investigation for corruption today." Helwani has claimed that Abdelaziz called Helwani's boss while he worked for ESPN and tried to have the journalist fired. "Despite all of that, I would shake his hand if he walked in here right now and bury the hatchet." As of August 2022, most of Abdelaziz's clients still declined to be interviewed by Helwani, with some exceptions. Helwani has expressed confusion at why those fighters allow someone who works for them, tell them what to do.

Tony Khan
Helwani has an ongoing feud with All Elite Wrestling founder Tony Khan. The feud began in October 2022 when Khan was interviewed on The Ariel Helwani Show, and refused to comment or answer questions on numerous questions pertinent to the status of AEW at the time (namely, CM Punk's contract status after the events of the All Out (2022) post-show media scrum), a fact that Helwani publicly stated made the interview the worst he'd ever conducted. The feud escalated when Helwani was invited by AEW competitor WWE to appear at Elimination Chamber (2023) (and the WWE Smackdown broadcast prior), both held in his hometown of Montreal. During the Smackdown broadcast, Khan referred to Helwani as a fraud on Twitter, which lead to Helwani to refer to Khan as a "snowman". This feud was played out during the Elimination Chamber broadcast when WWE commentator Michael Cole referred to Helwani as an, "unbiased, world-renowned, combat sports journalist". According to Helwani himself, Cole's words on commentary, "popped the boys in the back".

Honors and awards 
Helwani has won MMA Journalist of the Year at the World MMA Awards every year since 2010. In 2011, Fight! Magazine named him as one of their "Power 20", a list of the "most significant power players, movers, shakers, ambassadors, and game-changers in MMA". Helwani won 2014 Journalist of the Year at the Awakening WMMA Awards.

Helwani has hosted two separate Helwani Nose Awards events in Chicago and Las Vegas, where current and former MMA fighters participate in a UFC trivia show for the Nose World Order belt.

References

External links
Helwani on Substack
JarryPark.com – Helwani's first website

Living people
1982 births
American male journalists
American people of Egyptian-Jewish descent
American people of Lebanese-Jewish descent
American sports journalists
American television journalists
Canadian male journalists
Canadian people of Egyptian-Jewish descent
Canadian people of Lebanese-Jewish descent
Canadian sports journalists
Canadian television journalists
Anglophone Quebec people
ESPN people
Jews from Quebec
Jewish American journalists
Jewish Canadian journalists
Journalists from Montreal
Mixed martial arts journalists
People from Mount Royal, Quebec
S.I. Newhouse School of Public Communications alumni
Professional wrestling journalists and columnists